Talk Dirty to Me Part III is a 1984 pornographic film and a spoof on the mainstream film Splash and is the second sequel to the original 1980 film Talk Dirty to Me. John Leslie had the lead role, playing "Jack", a character he had played in the first two installments of the Talk Dirty to Me series. Other cast members include Amber Lynn, Peter North, Jamie Gillis and Ginger Lynn. It won Best Film at the 1985 AVN Awards.

Leslie would continue to play Jack in two more installments of the series, after which the films became less relevant to the original film. At least a dozen Talk Dirty to Me films would ultimately be produced into the early 2000s.

Controversy

The original film is controversial for having Traci Lords in the cast (she was in fact featured in the original poster for the film and plays a key role). Following the May 1986 revelations that she was underage under U.S. law during filming, the movie was re-edited with Lisa De Leeuw replacing her in re-shot scenes. However, the re-shot footage was done on NTSC videotape, which did not match well with the remaining original 35mm film footage.

Scene breakdown

References

External links 
 
 

1980s pornographic films
Films about mermaids
Child pornography
1980s English-language films